James Campbell Isaminger (December 6, 1880 – June 17, 1946) was an American sportswriter for newspapers in Philadelphia from 1905 to 1940, covering every World Series during that time.

Biography
Isaminger was born in Hamilton, Ohio, and worked for the Cincinnati Times-Star from 1895 to 1905. He moved to the Philadelphia North American, and then to The Philadelphia Inquirer in 1925. Isaminger played a major role, along with Hugh Fullerton and Ring Lardner, in breaking the story of the Black Sox scandal in 1919. In 1934, he was elected president of the Baseball Writers' Association of America (BBWAA).

In September 1940, Isaminger suffered a stroke while attending a baseball game at Municipal Stadium in Cleveland.  He retired after the stroke.

Isaminger died in June 1946 at his home in Fawn Grove, Pennsylvania. In 1974, he was posthumously honored by the BBWAA with the J. G. Taylor Spink Award for distinguished baseball writing.  Recipients of the Spink Award are recognized at the National Baseball Hall of Fame and Museum in what is commonly referred to as the "writers wing" of the Hall of Fame.

Notes

References

External links 
 Baseball Hall of Fame Profile
 

1880 births
1946 deaths
People from Hamilton, Ohio
Journalists from Ohio
Baseball writers
American male journalists
American sportswriters
The Philadelphia Inquirer people
BBWAA Career Excellence Award recipients